Martin Hvastija (born 30 November 1969) is a Slovenian cyclist who competed at the 2000 Summer Olympics.

Major results

1997
 1st Stages 1, 3 & 7 Circuito Montañés
 1st Overall GP Kranj
1998
 1st Overall GP Kranj
1st Stage 3
1999
 3rd Overall Danmark Rundt
2000
 1st Poreč Trophy 4
2001
 1st Stage 4 Vuelta a Andalucía
 1st Omloop van de Vlaamse Scheldeboorden
 3rd E3 Harelbeke
2002
 5th Gent–Wevelgem
2004
 1st Stage 5 Peace Race
2005
 1st GP Kranj

External links

 

1969 births
Living people
Slovenian male cyclists
Cyclists at the 2000 Summer Olympics
Sportspeople from Ljubljana
Olympic cyclists of Slovenia
Slovenian cycling coaches